A pusher, pusher craft, pusher boat, pusher tug, or towboat, is a boat designed for pushing barges or car floats. In the United States, the industries that use these vessels refer to them as towboats.  These vessels are characterized by a square bow, a shallow draft, and typically have knees, which are large plates mounted to the bow for pushing barges of various heights.  These boats usually operate on rivers and inland waterways.  Multiple barges lashed together, or a boat and any barges lashed to it, are referred to as a "tow" and can have dozens of barges.  Many of these vessels, especially the long distances, or long haul boats, include living quarters for the crew.

Size

Smaller boats are used in harbors, fleeting areas and around locks while larger boats operate in "line-haul" operations over long distances and between major ports. In the United States, south of the Chain of Rocks Lock across from St. Louis on the Mississippi River, the river is open with no locks or impediments other than channel size and depth. Larger boats can run this segment of the river with the maximum tow size of 42 barges southbound and 40+ northbound.

In the United States above St. Louis on the Upper Mississippi River and on other rivers such as the Illinois, Ohio, Arkansas, Tennessee and Cumberland, boats can handle only up to 16 barges including a "hip" barge due to the size of lock chambers.

Towboats in line-haul service operate 24/7 and have the latest in navigational equipment, such as color radar, GPS systems, electronic river charts, and specialized radio communications.

Boats that traverse the Intracoastal Waterway (ICW) are commonly referred to as "ditch boats" or "canal boats". ICW tows usually consist of 1 to 6 barges ranging in size, usually "strung out" end to end when loaded or "breasted up" side by side when empty.

Towboats always push the "tow" of barges, which are lashed together with steel cables usually  in diameter.

History

The term towboat arises from steamboat days, when steamboat fortunes began to decline and to survive, steamboats began to "tow" wooden barges alongside to earn additional revenue.  Eventually, the railroad expansion following the American Civil War ended the steamboat era.

During the 19th century, towboats were used to push showboats, which lacked steam engines to free up space for a theater.

Preserved towboats
The Binnenvaartmuseum ('Inland Shipping Museum') in Dordrecht, South Holland, Netherlands is centered around René Siegfried, a River Rhine pusher boat which was built in 1963 and decommissioned in 1989.

The W. P. Snyder Jr., also known as W. H. Clingerman, W. P. Snyder Jr. State Memorial, or J. L. Perry, is a historic towboat moored on the Muskingum River in Marietta, Ohio, at the Ohio River Museum. A National Historic Landmark, she is the only intact steam-driven sternwheel towboat still on the United States river system.

See also
American Waterways Operators
River cruise
Riverboat
Paddle steamer
Sampan
Tugboat

Notes

References
 Nautical terminology specific to towboating and inland waterways.

External links

"Diesel Engines For Towboat", December 1931, Popular Mechanics bottom of page 981

 
Boat types

cs:Remorkér
pt:Rebocador
ru:Буксир